Nebria cordicollis is a species of black coloured ground beetle from Nebriinae subfamily that can be found in Italy and Switzerland.

Subspecies
The species bears 8 subspecies some of which could be found in Italy, others in Switzerland, and one in Germany:
Nebria cordicollis cordicollis Chaudoir, 1837 Italy, Switzerland
Nebria cordicollis escheri Heer, 1837 Italy, Switzerland
Nebria cordicollis gracilis K. Daniel & J. Daniel, 1890 Switzerland
Nebria cordicollis heeri K. Daniel, 1903 Switzerland
Nebria cordicollis kochi Schatzmayr, 1940 Italy
Nebria cordicollis praegensis Huber & Molenda, 2004 Germany
Nebria cordicollis tenuissima Banninger, 1925 Switzerland
Nebria cordicollis ticinensis Banninger, 1951 Switzerland

References

cordicollis
Beetles described in 1837
Beetles of Europe